Dedin is a locality in the Shire of Douglas, Queensland, Australia.

Geography 
The location is entirely within the Daintree National Park with the exception of a small area in the north-west of the locality which is in the Mount Windsor National Park.

References 

Shire of Douglas
Localities in Queensland